Red soil is a type of soil that typically develops in warm, temperate, and humid climates and comprise approximately 13% of Earth's soils. It contains thin organic and organic-mineral layers of highly leached soil resting on a red layer of alluvium. Red soils contain large amounts of clay and are generally derived from the weathering of ancient crystalline and metamorphic rock. They are named after their rich red color, which can vary from reddish brown to reddish yellow as a result of their high iron content. Red soil can be good or poor growing soil depending on how it is managed. It is usually low in nutrients and humus and can be difficult to cultivate due to its low water holding capacity; however, the fertility of these soils can be optimized with liming and other farming techniques.

Red soils are an important resource because they make up such a large portion of farmland on the earth. In countries such as China, India, and Greece where there are large amounts of red soil, understanding the soil's properties are crucial to successful agriculture. Red soil properties can vary across regions and may require different management practices to achieve the best results.

Characteristics 
Red soils include multiple soil types (e.g. ultisols, alfisols, oxisols) that are classified as red soil when they develop a distinct reddish color, which can vary from reddish brown to reddish yellow due to their high iron content. In general, red soils possess some characteristics of a good growing soil . They are generally acidic soils, which can be positive for agriculture, but in this case often causes a lack of sufficient nutrients. These soils are also prone to frequent drought in drier regions.

Composition 
Red soils are generally derived from the weathering of crystalline and metamorphic rock in areas of high rainfall. Red soil contains large amounts of clay and thin organic and organic-mineral layers of highly leached soil resting on an alluvium red layer. The composition and agricultural properties of red soil varies across regions. One type of red soil may be considered infertile in one region but nutrient-rich in another. There is not a singular composition that classifies all red soils.

Soil fertility and management practices 
Red soils are typically difficult for crop cultivation because high leaching leads to low water holding capacity, low nutrients, low organic matter (humus), and acidification. Fluctuations in the concentration of iron within red soil are found to have significant implications on its fertility and growth properties. The fertility of red soils can be improved with various farming techniques.

Liming 
The process of soil liming helps to raise the pH of acidic soils. Because red soils are generally acidic in nature, liming is a useful farming technique to allow crops that don't tolerate acidic environments to thrive in red soil. However, modern research suggests that liming may have long-term environmental consequences on the soil. The systematic overflow of water through the soil gets into the organic matter of relevant sophgate of the soil.

Nutrient application 
Red soils are often deficient in nitrogen, which limits the growth properties of the large majority of red soil. Phosphorus and potassium can also become limited after the land has been harvested repeatedly. Nutrient application techniques introduce more of these lacking nutrients to the soil and allow them to restore chemicals that had diminished over time.

Organic matter 
Another management practice that can be used to improve the fertility of red soil is incorporating greater organic matter into the soil. Some strategies employed to practice this include the use of organic manure, and establishing proper tillage systems for the land.

Crop rotation 
The rotation of crops grown in red soil can significantly help to limit some of the compositional issues mentioned previously. Crop rotation helps to increase the content of organic matter, minimize the nitrogen deficiency, and help avoid pests that damage the crops.

Geography

Red soil in China 
Red soil resources are estimated to cover 102 million hectare (1,020,000 square kilometeres) of land in tropical and subtropical regions of China. The primary areas of distribution are Hainan, Guangdong, and Yunnan among other agricultural regions.

Red soil in Greece 
Red soils in have a significant role in the agriculture in Greece as well. They fall into two groups: residual soil forming in place from parent rock, and soil forming in deep sedimentary deposits. The residual red soils in Greece tend to be less than a meter in depth and form on sloping hillsides. Like other red soils in the Mediterranean, they tend to form in limestone. The red soils that form in deep sediments are widespread in the lowlands of Greece, occurring on gently sloping terrain. Taxonomically, the Greek red soils belong to Rhodoxeralfs (red alfisol), Palexeralfs (well aged alfisols), Xerochrepts (xeric inceptisol), and Orthents.

Red soil in India 
Red soils denote the largest soil group of India, covering an area of about 350,000 km2 (10.6% of India's area) across the peninsula. India is rich with red soils in their southern, eastern, and northern regions. There, the soil appears yellow in its hydrated form. This soil, also known as the omnibus group, have been developed over Archaean granite, gneiss and other crystalline rocks, the sedimentaries of the Cuddapah and Vindhayan basins and mixed Dharwarian group of rocks. In the uplands of India, the red soils are thin, poor and gravelly, sandy, or stony and porous, light-colored soils on which food crops like bajra can be grown. In contrast, on the lower plains and valleys they are rich, deep, dark colored fertile loam which, under irrigation, can produce excellent crops like cotton, wheat, pulses, tobacco, jowar, linseed, millet, potatoes and fruits.

Red soil in Canada 
Prince Edward Island is famous for its iron-rich red soil.

See also
 Ultisol, or red clay soil
 Latosol, or tropical red earth
Inceptisol, or a soil order

References

Types of soil
Geology of India